Galperina is a surname. Notable people with the surname include:

 Eleonora Yakovlevna Galperina, better known as Nora Gal (1912–1991), Soviet writer and translator
 Revekka Galperina (1894–1974), Soviet editor and translator

See also
 Galperin, another surname